"A Mind of Its Own" is a song by British singer-songwriter Victoria Beckham. It was released on 11 February 2002 as the second single from her debut  self-titled solo album (2001). It peaked and debuted at number six on the UK Singles Chart and sold 56,570 becoming the 173rd best seller of 2002. Beckham also recorded a version of the song in French ("Mon cœur n'en fait qu'à sa tête — My heart does what it wants to do").

Track listings
 UK CD and cassette single
 "A Mind of Its Own" – 3:48
 "Always Be My Baby" – 3:29
 "Feels So Good" – 3:47

 European CD single
 "A Mind of Its Own" – 3:48
 "Feels So Good" – 3:47

 UK DVD single
 "A Mind of Its Own" (video) – 3:48
 "Always Be My Baby" (audio plus photo gallery) – 3:29
 "Feels So Good" (audio plus photo gallery) – 3:47
 Victoria 'Behind the Scenes' at the video shoot 1 – 0:30
 Victoria 'Behind the Scenes' at the video shoot 2 – 0:30
 Victoria 'Behind the Scenes' at the video shoot 3 – 0:30
 Victoria 'Behind the Scenes' at the video shoot 4 – 0:30

Personnel
Personnel are adapted from the UK CD single liner notes.
 Victoria Beckham – writing
 Steve Kipner – writing, production
 Andrew Frampton – writing, production
 Mark "Spike" Stent – mixing
 Paul "P-Dub" Walton – mix engineering

Charts

References

2001 songs
2002 singles
Songs written by Andrew Frampton (songwriter)
Songs written by Steve Kipner
Songs written by Victoria Beckham
Victoria Beckham songs
Virgin Records singles